Synchiropus hawaiiensis, the Hawaiian bigeye dragonet, is a species of fish in the family Callionymidae, the dragonets. It is found in the Hawaiian Islands.

Etymology
The fish is named after Hawaii where the fish is found.

References

hawaiiensis
Fish of the Pacific Ocean
Fish of Hawaii
Taxa named by Ronald Fricke
Fish described in 2000